Carglumic acid, sold under the brand name Carbaglu among others, is used for the treatment of hyperammonaemia.

Carglumic acid is a carbamoyl phosphate synthetase 1 (CPS 1) activator.

The most common adverse effects include vomiting, abdominal pain, pyrexia (fever), and tonsillitis, anemia, diarrhea, ear infection, other infections, nasopharyngitis, decreased hemoglobin levels, and headache.

It was approved for medical use in the United States in March 2010. Carglumic acid is an orphan drug. It is available as a generic medication.

Medical uses 
Carglumic acid is indicated for the treatment of acute hyperammonemia and chronic hyperammonemia.

References

External links 
 

Amino acid derivatives
Carbamates
Dicarboxylic acids
Orphan drugs